Wurigumula ( 
Mongolian Cyrillic:, Latin: Urgamal) is a Chinese professional football player who plays as a forward for Changchun Jiuyin Loans. She studied in the Inner Mongolia Normal University.

References

1996 births
Living people
Chinese women's footballers
China women's international footballers
Footballers at the 2020 Summer Olympics
Olympic footballers of China
Chinese people of Mongolian descent
People from Chifeng
Women's association footballers not categorized by position